Islamic Center of Central Missouri is a mosque located in Columbia, Missouri. Established in 1983, it is the first Islamic center in the state of Missouri.

Events

Friday Sermons
Friday sermons,(khuṭbah) (lit. narration) are held every week from 12-12:45pm and 1-2pm. Khatib at this Islamic Center is usually a member of the local Muslim community. Sometimes national Muslim speakers are also invited. Prominent khateebs who have spoken at the Islamic Center include Suhaib Webb.

Open House
Every Spring, the mosque holds an open house where followers of other faiths are invited to visit the center, learn more about Islam and ask questions about the faith and its tenets. Free mediterranean food, appetizers, dessert and refreshments are provided to visitors. Visitors can also pick up free reading material on Islam and the Muslim faith.

Eid Prayers
Eid ul-Fitr and Eid al-Adha prayer ceremonies are held every year.
 The Eid-Al-Adha prayers in November 2010 were attended by about 750  Muslims from the Columbia area.

See also
  List of mosques in the Americas
  Lists of mosques 
  List of mosques in the United States

References

External links

Buildings and structures in Columbia, Missouri
Mosques in Missouri
1983 establishments in Missouri
Mosques completed in 1983
Religion in Columbia, Missouri